Gifted Child Quarterly is a peer-reviewed academic journal covering the field of education. The journal's editors-in-chief are Jill L. Adelson of the Duke University Talent Identification Program and Michael S. Matthews of the University of North Carolina at Charlotte. The journal was established in 1957 and is published by SAGE Publications in association with the National Association for Gifted Children.

Abstracting and indexing 
The journal is abstracted and indexed in Scopus and the Social Sciences Citation Index. According to the Journal Citation Reports, its 2018 impact factor is 1.304, ranking it 41st out of 59 journals in the category "Psychology, Educational" and 24th out of 41 journals in the category "Education, Special".

Open Science 
In December, 2018, under the leadership of  Co-Editors Jill L. Adelson and Michael S. Matthews, GCQ was the first gifted education journal to sign the Transparency and Openness Promotion (TOP) Guidelines. In March 2019, they announced the journal's commitment to transparency, openness, and research improvement in an open-access article. The journal is committed to meeting Level I or better in all eight areas of the TOP Guidelines: citation standards, data transparency, analytic methods (code) transparency, research materials transparency, design and analysis transparency, study and analysis plan preregistration, and replication. To that end, GCQ submission guidelines were expanded to encourage submission of replication studies with peer review, with particular encouragement to use Registered Reports for replication studies (Level III); to require authors to provide appropriate citations for data and materials, when appropriate (Level III); and to require authors to state whether data are available, and if so, where to access them (Level I).

To encourage individual researchers to implement open science practices, GCQ implemented an Open Science badge system in 2019, using small icons to communicate clearly to readers when articles have implemented specific open science practices. The badges indicate the following practices: (1) data are available in a public, open-access repository with a DOI or other permanent path; (2) materials (e.g., analytic code, interview protocols) are available in a public, open-access repository with a DOI or other permanent path; and (3) a preregistration (and, if applicable, analysis) plan was registered in a public, open-access repository with a DOI or other permanent path prior to the examination of the data or observing the outcomes.

References

External links 
 
Facebook page
Twitter account

English-language journals
Gifted education
Quarterly journals
Publications established in 1957
SAGE Publishing academic journals
Special education journals